Rubinfeld is a surname. Notable people with this surname include:

Arthur Rubinfeld, former Chief Creative Officer at Starbucks
Daniel L. Rubinfeld, American economist
Ronitt Rubinfeld (born 1964), American electrical engineer and computer scientist